David Copperfield's laser illusion is an illusion performed by David Copperfield in several magic shows. The magician or his assistant is cut by a "laser" into two or more parts and starts walking.

Illusion description

As performed during the 2001 TV special Copperfield: Tornado of Fire, Copperfield was "cut in half" by his assistant or assistants, wielding the laser beam. Sparks and flames flew where the beam "hits" his body.  Copperfield then demonstrated to the audience that he was truly in two pieces by lowering the top half of his body onto a chair while the lower half of his body (waist down) remained visibly standing.  As the finale, Copperfield, still separated from the waist, held on to his legs as he walked and hopped to the front of the stage, where he lifted the upper half of his body onto the bottom half and "re-connected" himself.

The illusion is not currently featured in the live performances of David Copperfield, who rotates effects in and out of his repertoire as new material evolves and is developed.

See also
 Portal
 Vanishing the Statue of Liberty
 Walking Through the Great Wall of China
 Death Saw
 Flying
 Squeeze box

References

Dawes, A. E., et al.  Making Magic.  London: Multimedia Books, Ltd, 1993.

Magic tricks
2001 establishments in the United States
2001 in American television
Laser art
Television about magic